Nordman is a surname. Notable people with the surname include:

Edward Nordman (1864-1939), American politician and farmer
Grant Nordman (born 1950), Canadian politician
Maria Nordman (born 1943), American sculptor
Ric Nordman (1919–1996), Canadian businessman and politician